Taveta is a genus of moths of the family Erebidae. The genus was erected by J. Malcolm Fawcett in 1916.

Species
Taveta eucosmia Hampson, 1926 (Kenya, Madagascar, Malawi)
Taveta syrnix Fawcett, 1916 (East Africa)

References

Calpinae
Moth genera